Aralluy-e Kuchek (also Romanized as Ārāllūy-e Kūchek; also known as Ārāllū and Ārāllū-ye Kūchek) is a village in Fuladlui Shomali Rural District, Hir District, Ardabil County, Ardabil Province, Iran. At the 2006 census, its population was 716, in 148 families.

References 

Towns and villages in Ardabil County